Teradyne, Inc. is an American automatic test equipment (ATE) designer and manufacturer based in North Reading, Massachusetts. Teradyne's high-profile customers include Samsung, Qualcomm, Intel, Analog Devices, Texas Instruments and IBM.

History

Teradyne was founded by Alex d'Arbeloff and Nick DeWolf, who were classmates at the Massachusetts Institute of Technology (MIT) in the late 1940s. The men founded Teradyne in 1960, and set up shop in rented space above Joe and Nemo's hotdog stand in downtown Boston. The name, Teradyne, was intended to represent a very forceful presence. 1,000,000,000,000 dynes = 10 meganewtons (2,248,089 pounds-force or 1,019,716 kilograms-force).

d'Arbeloff and DeWolf knew that testing electronic components in high-volume production would reach a bottleneck, unless the tasks performed by technicians and laboratory instruments could be automated. Their business plan involved a new breed of "industrial-grade" electronic test equipment, known for its technical performance, reliability and economic payback.

In 1961, d'Arbeloff and DeWolf sold their first product, a logic-controlled go/no-go diode tester, to Raytheon.

In the 1980s, Teradyne expanded its sub-assembly test business by acquiring Zehntel, a leading manufacturer of in-circuit board test systems. In 1987, the company introduced the first analog VLSI test system, the A500, which led the market in testing integrated devices that provided the interface between analog and digital data.

The 1990s brought more diversification. The company acquired Megatest Corporation, which expanded its Semiconductor Test group to include smaller and less expensive testers than had been currently available. Teradyne also became a market leader in high-end System-on-a-Chip (SoC) test with its Catalyst and Tiger test systems.

In 2000, Teradyne Connection Systems acquired Herco Technologies and Synthane-Taylor, and a year later they acquired circuit-board test and inspection leader, GenRad, and merged it into the Assembly Test Division. GenRad's Diagnostic Solutions, which made test equipment for the automotive manufacturing and service industries, became a separate product group for Teradyne.

In 2006, Teradyne sold its two Boston buildings and consolidated all of its Boston-area staff to its current site in North Reading, Massachusetts.

Teradyne grew its semiconductor test business with the addition of Nextest and Eagle Test Systems in 2008, serving the flash memory test market and high-volume analog test market, respectively. That same year, Teradyne entered the disk-drive test market with the internally developed Neptune product, which serves the data-intensive internet and computing storage markets.

In 2010, Teradyne celebrated its 50th anniversary. The following year, it acquired LitePoint Corporation, a leading provider of test instruments for use with wireless products, such as laptops PCs, tablets, home networking and cell phones. With the addition of LitePoint, Teradyne's product portfolio stretched from wafer test of semiconductor chips to system-level circuit boards to products ready for store shelves.

Upon d'Arbeloff's retirement, George Chamillard assumed the post of President and CEO. He was replaced at his retirement by former CFO Mike Bradley. Bradley retired in January 2014, and was in turn replaced by Semiconductor Test Division president Mark Jagiela.

Teradyne operates major facilities around the world, with headquarters in North Reading, Massachusetts.

Timeline

Timeline showing notable milestones, major acquisitions and key innovations.

1960 - Teradyne founded in Boston, MA by Alex d'Arbeloff and Nick DeWolf.

1961 - First product, the D133 diode tester, sold by Raytheon Company.

1966 - Teradyne moves headquarters from the Summer street loft above Joe & Nemo's hot dog stand to 183 Essex Street, Boston.

1966 - Teradyne introduces the first computer controlled chip tester, the J259.

1969 - Teradyne launches Teradyne Dynamic Systems after acquiring Triangle Systems to develop digital semiconductor test systems in Chatsworth, CA.

1970 - Teradyne becomes a publicly owned company and is listed on the New York Stock Exchange (symbol TER), 420,000 shares are sold to the public.

1971 - Alex d'Arbeloff is named President of Teradyne.

1973 - Teradyne launches Teradyne Central in Chicago, IL to develop telecommunications test systems.

1973 - Teradyne introduces the world's first subscriber-line test system, 4TEL.

1979 - Teradyne passes $100 million in sales; A300 Analog LSI test system introduced.

1980 - Teradyne introduces the first combinational in-circuit/functional circuit board test system, the L200.

1981 - Teradyne announces the first VLSI test system with non-stop pattern generation, the J941.

1986 - Teradyne introduces the first analog VLSI test system, the A500.

1988 - Teradyne introduces the first PC-based circuit board tester to use spreadsheet programming, the Z1800-Series.

1990 - Teradyne launches company-wide Total Quality Management initiative.

1993 - Teradyne receives $63 million order from Deutsche Telekom for 4TEL telecommunications test systems, a record for the company.

1996 - Teradyne introduces the Spectrum 8800-Series Manufacturing Test Platform, the first VXI-based in-circuit tester.

1996 - Marlin Memory Test system introduced; the first system capable of simultaneous test and redundancy analysis of DRAMs.

1997 - Teradyne creates the J973, the first Structural to Functional test system with the ability to shift in real time.

1997 - Teradyne introduces Catalyst, the first System-On-A-Chip (SOC) test system.

1998 - Teradyne introduces the Integra J750, a test system for high volume test of low-cost devices.

2000 - Teradyne Japan Division announces a new generation of image sensor test systems, the IP-750.

2004 - Teradyne introduces the FLEX family of test systems, for high volume, high mix, complex SOC devices.

2006 - Teradyne moves headquarters to North Reading, MA.

2008 - Teradyne acquires Eagle Test Systems and Nextest Systems.

2011 - Teradyne acquires LitePoint to advance production testing for the development and manufacturing of wireless devices.

2015 - Teradyne acquires Danish company Universal Robots.

2018 - Teradyne acquires Mobile Industrial Robots (MiR) and Energid to expand its Industrial Automation business to include Autonomous Mobile Robots and motion control and simulation software for robotics.

Divisions

The Semiconductor Test Division provides test equipment used by integrated circuit manufacturers to test logic, RF, analog, power, mixed-signal and memory devices. Teradyne manufactures five principal families of testers known as the "J750", "FLEX," "UltraFLEX," “Eagle” and “Magnum” series. These testers are used by semiconductor manufacturers to test and classify the individual devices ("dies") on a completed semiconductor wafer and then used again to retest the parts once they are enclosed in their final packaging.

The System Test Group builds testers for completed circuit boards (printed circuit boards/printed wiring boards) and hard drives. The division addresses next-level electronics production for consumer, communications, industrial and government customers. Major product families in the system test business include: TestStation, Spectrum Series, High-Speed Subsystem, Neptune, Saturn and Titan. Portions of this division were acquired when Teradyne purchased GenRad in 2002.

LitePoint, Teradyne's wireless test business, provides services for leading manufacturers of wireless modules and consumer electronics. Serving the rapidly growing wireless communications industry, LitePoint products are used by chipset and product designers along with their contract manufacturers. LitePoint's products include IQxel for connectivity test and IQxstream for cellular test.

Teradyne's industrial automation business is composed of Universal Robots, Mobile Industrial Robots, AutoGuide and Energid.

Universal Robots (UR) provides collaborative robots (cobots) that work side-by-side with production workers. UR cobots automate tasks including machine tending, packaging, gluing, painting, polishing and assembling parts. The cobots are deployed in the automotive, food and agriculture, furniture and equipment, metal and machining, plastics and polymers, and pharma and chemicals industries.

Mobile Industrial Robots (MiR) offers autonomous mobile robots for managing internal logistics (for payloads under 1,500 kg). These robots are currently used in the transportation, healthcare, pharmaceutical, metal and plastics, fashion, technology and food industries.

AutoGuide Mobile Robots manufactures modular industrial mobile robots (for payloads up to 45,000 kg). These high-payload robots are used for assembly, material handling, warehousing and distribution operations across multiple industries.

Energid specializes in the control and simulation of complex robotic systems, and is used in the aerospace, agriculture, manufacturing, transportation, defense and medical industries.

References

External links
 

Electronics companies of the United States
Equipment semiconductor companies
Electronic test equipment manufacturers
Manufacturing companies based in Massachusetts
Companies based in Middlesex County, Massachusetts
North Reading, Massachusetts
1970s initial public offerings
Electronics companies established in 1960
1960 establishments in Massachusetts
Companies listed on the New York Stock Exchange